B. F. Hanson House is a historic home located near Middletown, New Castle County, Delaware.  It was built in 1843, and is a frame dwelling consisting of a rectangular, two-story, five-bay, central hall plan main block, with a two-story rear ell. It is in a vernacular Greek Revival style.  It has a front porch supported by four columns and features graded siding, applied pilasters with capitals and footers, integrated brick chimneys, and a double ridge cornice.

It was listed on the National Register of Historic Places in 1982.

References

Houses on the National Register of Historic Places in Delaware
Greek Revival houses in Delaware
Houses completed in 1843
Houses in New Castle County, Delaware
1843 establishments in Delaware
National Register of Historic Places in New Castle County, Delaware